The 2015 Barbados Premier Division (officially the Digicel Premiere League for sponsorship reasons) was the 69th season of the highest tier of football in Barbados. Barbados Defense Force won their final six matches to hold off Rendezvous FC for their third consecutive league title and fifth overall. With BDF having already completed their schedule, Rendezvous FC needed to make up 11 goals in goal differential with a win on the final day of the season to pull even with BDF, but managed only a 2-1 victory over Weymouth Wales. The season began on February 8 and concluded on July 23.

Changes from 2014
 Cosmos and Dayrells Road FC were relegated to the Barbados First Division.
 Rendezvous FC and U.W.I. BlackBirds were promoted to the Premier Division.

Table

Results

Statistics

Top Scorers

Hat-tricks

References

2011
Barb
Barb
football